Ari Banias is an American poet whose work has been featured in Troubling the Line: Trans and Genderqueer Poetry and Poetics, American Poetry Review, Boston Review, and POETRY.

Early life and education 
Banias was born in Los Angeles and grew up in Chicago. He received a Bachelor of Arts degree from Sarah Lawrence College and a Master of Fine Arts degree in poetry from Hunter College.

Career 
He published his first book of poetry, Anybody, in 2016. Anybody was nominated for the PEN American Literary Award.

Banias has received the fellowships from the Wisconsin Institute for Creative Writing, the New York Foundation for the Arts, the Fine Arts Work Center in Provincetown, and Stanford University. He is an adjunct professor at the University of San Francisco.

In 2022, he was the winner of the Publishing Triangle Award for Trans and Gender-Variant Literature for A Symmetry. The poem was also published in The New York Times.

Personal life 
Banias lives in Berkeley, California.

Works 

 Anybody  (W.W. Norton, 2016)
 What's Personal is Being Here With All of You (Portable Press @ Yo-Yo Labs)

References 

Living people
American LGBT poets
Sarah Lawrence College alumni
Hunter College alumni
Year of birth missing (living people)
21st-century LGBT people
21st-century American poets
American male poets
University of San Francisco faculty
American transgender writers